The 2019–20 Wisła Kraków season is the 80th season in the Ekstraklasa and the 66th season in the Polish Cup.

Season review

Sponsors

Transfers

Summer transfer window

Arrivals 
 The following players moved to Wisła.

Departures
 The following players moved from Wisła.

Winter transfer window

Arrivals 
 The following players moved to Wisła.

Departures 
 The following players moved to Wisła.

Coaching staff

Competitions

Pre-season and friendlies

Ekstraklasa

League table

Regular season

Relegation round

Results summary

Regular season

Relegation round

Results by round

Regular season

Relegation Round

Regular season

Relegation round

Polish Cup

Squad and statistics

Appearances, goals and discipline

Goalscorers

Assists

Disciplinary record

References

Wisła Kraków seasons
Wisla Krakow